Paola del Medico Felix (born 5 October 1950) is a Swiss singer.

Career 
Born in Saint-Gall to an Italian father and a Swiss mother, Paola del Medico has sung mostly in German and French. She represented Switzerland at the Eurovision Song Contest 1969 with the song "Bonjour, Bonjour", finishing in fifth place.

In 1980, she represented Switzerland for a second time in the Eurovision Song Contest with "Cinéma", where she finished in fourth place.

Between 1981 and 1990 she co-hosted "Verstehen Sie Spaß?", a Candid Camera-style show, for the German TV station ARD together with her husband Kurt Felix.

She was in contention to represent Germany for the Eurovision Song Contest 1982 with the song "Peter Pan", but she finished 2nd in the national final.

Discography

Albums 
 1970: Die grossen Erfolge
 1974: Paola
 1978: Blue Bayou
 1980: Lieder die ich liebe
 1981: Ihre größten Erfolge
 1981: Frohe Weihnachten mit Paola und den Trixis
 1983: Rosafarben
 1988: Kinderlieder-Hitparade mit Paola und den Sonnenschein-Kindern
 1989: Meine Lieder
 2000: Paola am Blue Bayou

Singles
Für alle Zeiten 1968 
Regentropfen 1968 
Bonjour, Bonjour 1969 
Stille Wasser die sind tief 1969 
So ist das Leben 1970 
Für uns beide (Green Green Trees) 1970 
Glück und Leid 1970 
Emporte-moi sur ton manège 1970 
So wie du 1971 
Überall ist Liebe 1971 
Lass die Liebe besteh'n 1972 
Es geht um dich – es geht um mich (I'm on My Way) 1972 
Ich tanz' nach deiner Pfeife (The Pied Piper) 1973 
Ich gestehe alles 1973 
Capri-Fischer 1974 
Addio, mein Napoli 1974 
Das Glück im Leben ist ein Schatz 1975 
Weisse Rosen aus Athen 1975 
Rendezvous um vier 1975 
Schade um den Mondenschein 1976 
Le livre blanc 1977 
Morgen bekommst du mehr von mir 1977 
Lonely blue boy 1977 
Blue Bayou 1978 
Ich bin kein Hampelmann (Substitute) 1978 
Vogel der Nacht 1979 
Wie du (Bright eyes) 1979 
Ich sehe Tränen wenn du lachst 1980 
Cinéma 1980 
Mit dir leben (Love me tender) 1980 
Der Teufel und der junge Mann 1980 
Liebe ist nicht nur ein Wort 1981 
Mein Geschenk für dich (Happy everything) 1981 
Wenn du heimkommst 1982 
Peter Pan 1982 
Ich hab in's Paradies gesehn (I've never been to me) 1982 
Träume mal schön von Hawaii 1983 
Bitte hilf mir heute nacht 1983 
Rosafarben (Sarà quel che sarà) 1983 
Engel brauchen Liebe 1984 
Die Nacht der Nächte 1984 
Mode 1985 
Wahrheit & Liebe 1985 
Am Anfang einer neuen Liebe 1986 
Die Männer im allgemeinen 1987 
Rose der Nacht 1989

References

External links 
 
 Official page of Paola Del Medico and Kurt Felix. (in German.)

1950 births
Living people
Eurovision Song Contest entrants of 1969
Eurovision Song Contest entrants of 1980
People from St. Gallen (city)
Eurovision Song Contest entrants for Switzerland
20th-century Swiss women singers
Swiss people of Italian descent